Patrick Klas (born 22 November 1975) is a Dutch judoka. He competed in the men's half-middleweight event at the 1996 Summer Olympics.

References

1975 births
Living people
Dutch male judoka
Olympic judoka of the Netherlands
Judoka at the 1996 Summer Olympics
Sportspeople from Tilburg
20th-century Dutch people